The Adventures of Sinbad is a Canadian Action/Adventure Fantasy television series which aired from 1996 to 1998. It follows on the story from the pilot of the same name. It revolves around the series' protagonist, Sinbad. The series is a re-telling of the adventures of Sinbad from The Arabian Nights. Created by Ed Naha, it was filmed in southern Ontario, Canada and in Cape Town, South Africa. The tone of the series resembled that of its contemporaries Hercules: The Legendary Journeys and Xena: Warrior Princess.

Description
A sword and sorcery adventure set in a land of myth and magic in the Middle East, around the Persian Gulf. The series tells of the adventures of Sinbad and his brother as they gather a crew, and set sail in the ship, Nomad, from Baghdad in search of wealth and adventure. Along the way they face witches, wizards, strange tribes and fantastic creatures.

Premise

In the first few episodes: After two years at sea, Sinbad returns to his home, Baghdad. The city is very different from the Baghdad he remembers. It is now in the control of prince Casib and his grand vizier Admir. He lands himself in prison, where he is reacquainted with his older brother, Doubar, and discovers he is to be beheaded. When the princess is kidnapped, the Caliph of Baghdad says Sinbad is the only man he knows who is capable of facing Turok, the man who captured the princess. Before Sinbad is beheaded, Doubar comes to the rescue and sets him free. The brothers meet up with the rest of Sinbad's crew and proceed to Turok's lair, in search for Princess Adena. Sinbad tells his crew they need the help of his and Doubar's old mentor, Master Dim-Dim, so the crew head off for the Isle of Dawn, where he resides. They arrive at the island where they meet Dim-Dim and his new apprentice, Maeve, along with her avian companion, Dermott, a hawk. After the crew leaves the island, Dim-Dim is taken into magical limbo by an enemy. Many episodes in the two seasons mention Dim-Dim, however with the show being cancelled without making the third season, there is never any resolution for finding him. After Dim-Dim goes missing, Maeve decides to join Sinbad and his crew in their search for the lost Master. They find many adventures along the way. Sinbad and his crew's goodness of heart always shines through in each episode.

Characters

Nomad crew

 Sinbad

Sinbad the Sailor is the series' main protagonist and captain of the ship, "Nomad". In the first episode he returns from a two-year absence, after being swept off his ship and presumed dead. He wears a rainbow bracelet after his return.

Portrayed by Zen Gesner.

 Doubar

Doubar is Sinbad's older brother. He is large and exceptionally strong.

Portrayed by George Buza.

 Firouz

Firouz is an inventor/scientist. Throughout the series, he invents many modern gadgets, including a bicycle, an umbrella, dynamite sticks and lasers. He frequently doubts in supernatural phenomena showed in the series.

Portrayed by Tim Progosh.

 Rongar

Rongar is a mute warrior. He is an expert at knife throwing. Season two features an episode that visits his home and gives the viewer his backstory.

Portrayed by Oris Erhuero.

 Maeve

Maeve is a Celtic sorceress, who is skilled in the arts of magic. She has a fiery personality and initially does not get along well with Sinbad, but later they become soulmates. She was only featured in the first season. The first episode for season two has her swept off the Nomad in the midst of a tempest and it is later discovered that the long-lost wizard Dim-Dim took her away to protect her from Rumina, a sorceress, and a long-time foe of both Sinbad and Maeve.

Portrayed by Jacqueline Collen. Collen did not return for the second season due to familial and contractual issues.

 Dermott

Dermott is a very intelligent hawk that joins the crew with Maeve. It is later discovered that Dermott is Maeve's brother, under a spell cast by Rumina.

Portrayed by Dermott the Hawk.

 Bryn

Bryn, a mysterious woman with a talent for magic, was introduced in season two. She meets Sinbad when he is washed ashore on the island she stays on. She had previously been washed ashore on the same island, and retained no memory of who she was or why she was there, apart from that her name was Bryn. She wore a rainbow bracelet matching Sinbad's, and when the two of them eventually managed to find the rest of the crew and escape the island, a message from Dim-Dim indicated she was the key to victory, presumably over the vengeful sorceress, Rumina. In the planned third season, it would have revealed that Bryn is Rumina's younger sister.

Portrayed by Mariah Shirley.

Allies

Season 1 allies
 Casendra
(Appeared in "The Village Vanishes")

Portrayed by Bianca Amato.

Season 2 allies
  Shires
(Appeared in "Ali Rashid and the Thieves")

Portrayed by Bianca Amato.

Villains
 Turok

Turok is an evil sorcerer that  is featured in the first two episodes, and the season one finale. He is also the father of Rumina and Bryn. He was to make a full return in the third season.

Portrayed by Juan Chiorian.

 Rumina

Rumina is the daughter of Turok. She is the main villain of the first season. She loves Sinbad, but simultaneously hates him for murdering her father. Rumina is an expert in the dark arts of magic, which is easy to learn compared to light magic. Rumina is also obsessed with killing Maeve, something she never manages to accomplish. In the planned third season, Rumina would have made her return, it would have also revealed that Rumina is Bryn's older sister.

Rumina is portrayed by Julianne Morris.

 Scratch

Scratch is a demon from the West. He calls himself the Devil and is a horned and hoofed creature. He goes by many different names, including the "Lord of the Flies". He is introduced in the episode "Conundrum" in season one and appears in two subsequent episodes.

Portrayed by Tony Caprari.

Season 1 villains
 Eblus
(Appeared in: "The Return of Sinbad")

A demon who worked with Turok, and the one responsible for Dim Dim's curse. He assumed a human guise and helped Turok bring ruin to whatever city he visited, and the last guise he used was Admir, grand vizier of prince Casib of Baghdad. His ruse was exposed when Rongar searched his belongings (revealed to be human flesh for him to consume), and he attempted to slay the crew, killing Mustapha with his poisonous tail. He was killed by Sinbad when the latter harpooned him in the mouth.

Portrayed by Lawrence Bayne.

 Vincenzo
(Appeared in: "Still Life")

An insane artist who transformed the rightful rulers of the Island he lived on and their army to marble through the use of magic gloves. He did the same to Dermott and Maeve, but was killed when Sinbad turned the power of the gloves against him, and sent the now petrified Vincenzo falling to his death.

Portrayed by Rob Stewart.

 Kris Kattah
(Appeared in: "The Ronin")

The wicked ruler of a nation, and Tetsu's former master. Kattah wielded a sword of evil magic that enabled him to transmute into a cloud of poisonous gas.  He was killed while in cloud form, when the crew and Tetsu used a giant pinwheel to disperse his body.

 The Gilling
(Appeared in: "The Ties that Bind")

A demon who blackmailed a crew of Vikings into kidnapping Maeve as a sacrifice in order to free their ship from his minion, a giant crab.

 Drax
(Appeared in: "The Prince Who Wasn't")

The insane uncle of Prince Xander, Drax was cursed to never sleep until the last of his brother's bloodline was erased. He believed this pertained to his nephew and had the boy killed, but Xander's spirit alerted Sinbad's crew to his uncle's actions, and revealed that his mother was pregnant with another child. Drax was then dragged off by the spirits of his victims.

Portrayed by Jack Langedijk.

 The Vorgon
(Appeared in "The Village Vanishes")

An immortal monster who possessed people and absorbed the souls of others. The Vorgon planned to possess Sinbad in order to travel the world to find more victims, knowing that Sinbad's reputation would prevent anyone from suspecting him. He lured Sinbad to his latest feeding ground with a fake message from Dim Dim, and began to absorb both the inhabitants and the crew. But he underestimated Sinbad, and was incinerated by the light of the setting sun (he could only come out during the day if he used a host body) after being hurled upward by a catapult.

 Zabtut
(Appeared in: "Masked Mauraders")

The corrupt royal protector of Mirhago, Zabtut and his goons robbed the subjects of their money with their unfair taxes. When Sinbad's crew teamed with the youths opposing Zabtut's tyranny, he attempted to flee via a magic carpet, but was followed by Sinbad, and fell to his death during his duel with the sailor.

 Vatek the Ghoul
(Appeared in: "The Ghoul's Tale")

An evil sorcerer who cursed Princess Gaia with death on her eighteenth birthday as revenge against her father.

Portrayed by Andrew Scorer.

 Bellamur
(Appeared in "The Rescue")

Once a renowned adventurer, Bellamur was in reality a cruel and vile man, tricking the crew into stealing back his unwilling fiancé, Jial, from her real true love, Turhan, a former enemy of Sinbad's. Bellamur's ruse was eventually discovered, and he was stabbed from behind by Jial just when he was about to kill Turhan.

 Mahmud
(Appeared in "Monument")

An alchemist from the island of Mylagia, Mahmud created a formula that turned him into a giant, but also warped his mind, causing him to see himself as a god, and plot to take over the world. His daughter, Jullaner, and the crew tried to convince him of his error, but Mahmud instead tried to kill them. However, while chasing Sinbad and Jullaner, Mahmud's now-superhuman weight caused him to plummet to the center of the world, as the ground beneath him could no longer support his size.

 The Trickster
(Appeared in "Trickster")

A mean-spirited demigod known by many names with a flair for playing cruel tricks on others. He tricked the crew and Rumina into entering a supposedly cursed area where Maeve and Rumina's magic was neutralized, then proceeded to plague the crew and the sorceress. His ruse was discovered when Dermott attacked him, forcing him to show his true form.

Portrayed by Ronald France.

 Fontassel
(Appeared in "The Siren's Song")

A greedy and heartless captain who sought to take Poseidon's Trident, only to harpoon a siren in the form of a dolphin. Fontassel and his men became the undead, having died days ago, but kept alive through dark magic. Fontassel attempted to take over the Nomad, but was stopped by Sinbad, and dragged off by Poseidon.

Portrayed by Danny Pawlick.

Season 2 villains
 Xantax
(Appeared in "The Sacrifice")

The ruler of a tribe of island people who attempted to sacrifice Bryn to the island's monster, Caymen. Killed in an explosion.

Portrayed by Jonathan Pienaar.

 Komopera
(Appeared in "The Return of the Ronin")

A powerful demon who kidnapped young women in order to force them to breed with his warriors and create a race of deadly warriors. Killed by Sinbad and Tetsu.

 Count Orlock
(Appeared in "Heart and Soul")

A sadistic vampire whose wife, Kalilah, had Sinbad try to retrieve her heart from him in order to finally die after centuries of forced marriage. He attempted to foil his wife's plans by stopping or killing Sinbad and Rongar, but was ultimately defeated when Sinbad exposed him to sunlight, and threw a broken off chair leg at his heart, killing him. Curiously, despite clearly being a vampire (displaying powers of shape-shifting and inhuman strength and durability),  Orlock absorbs souls rather than drink blood.

Portrayed by Gérard Rudolf.

 Timur the Elder
(Appeared in "The Voyage to Hell")

A legendary villain whose soul resided in Hell. He attempted to use his namesake son as a vessel, manipulating him into villainous acts, but was usually banished back to the underworld by his wife, a witch, who did what she could to save her son from becoming like his monster of a father. When he forcibly took his son into Hell to take over his son's body, Sinbad and the crew followed. In a duel with Sinbad, Timur fell into a chasm.

Portrayed by Dick Reineke.

 Ali Rashid
(Appeared in "Ali Rashid and the Thieves")

An evil merchant who stole Rongar's throne, and sent him into exile, Ali Rashid got hold of the Sword of Flame, and attempted to kill the crew. He was defeated by Sinbad and thrown off a balcony by Rongar.

Portrayed by Hakeem Kae-Kazim.

 Bakbuk
(Appeared in "The Gift")

A demented hunchback who attempted to join the legendary crew, the Adventurers, but due to an accident, damaged his back, and became an outcast. He spent the next several years plotting his revenge, using magic to bring his dolls to life, and kill the Adventurers one by one. He was seemingly killed when his carriage fell off a cliff, but at the end of the episode, a young girl is seen carrying a doll that bears his image.

Portrayed by Danny Pawlick.

Recurring characters
 Dim-Dim

Master Dim-Dim taught both Sinbad and Maeve and disappeared early on in the series. Sinbad and his crew continue to search for him.

Portrayed by Wayne Robson.

 Tetsu

Tetsu is a Ronin Warrior who also wears a rainbow bracelet, like Sinbad and Bryn. He appears once in both seasons.

Portrayed by Von Flores.

 Mustapha

Mustapha was in the same prison as Doubar and Sinbad. When they were released to search for the lost princess, Mustapha introduced his good friend Rongar to the team. He dies in Rongar's arms in the second episode after trying to defeat a monster on board of the Nomad.

Portrayed by Ian Tracey.

Other characters

Season 1

Season 2

Episode list

Season 1: 1996–97
In season one, Sinbad and his crew search for Master Dim-Dim, Sinbad and Maeve's old teacher who has disappeared.

Season 2: 1997–98
In the opening of season two, Maeve is swept away during a storm. In his attempt to rescue her, Sinbad washes up on an island where he meets Bryn, who joins his crew. This season is darker in tone than season one, and explores the mystery of the rainbow bracelets.

Planned third season
Due to the success of the show, a third and final season was planned, but a contract dispute led to the series' cancellation. According to Ed Naha, had the third season been made, Rumina would return after a year of absence with a renewed desire to kill Sinbad. Bryn would have been infected with an incubus, and the crew takes her to a healer, believing him to be Dim Dim, only to find out it's actually a now deformed Turok, who would remain a neutral character throughout the season and possibly be the one who would destroy Rumina, thus; freeing Dermott from her spell. It would also reveal that Bryn is Turok's daughter and Rumina's younger sister. The series finale would have also put a close to the mystery of the Rainbow Bracelets.

DVD Releases
Entertainment One released season 1 of The Adventures of Sinbad on DVD in Region 1 (Canada only) on May 25, 2004.  As of 2010, this release is now out of print.

Alliance Home Entertainment has released both seasons on DVD in Canada.

References

External links 
 

First-run syndicated television shows in Canada
Films based on Sinbad the Sailor
Period television series
Canadian adventure television series
Canadian action television series
Canadian fantasy television series
1996 Canadian television series debuts
1998 Canadian television series endings
Television series by Fremantle (company)
1990s Canadian drama television series
Television series by Alliance Atlantis
Television series by Entertainment One
Canadian action adventure television series